Edward Sutton Smalley was born about 1589 in Bideford, Devon. He moved to Maine about 1632 with his son Francis. With others, founded Piscataqua, which was afterwards divided into the towns of Kittery, Eliot, South Berwich and Berwick. He was on a grand jury in 1640 in Saco and a magistrate in Falmouth, Maine in 1645 and later went to the Isle of Shoals. Although he built a house in Piscataqua, before 1643, as a grant of one hundred acres made to him by Thomas Gorges, the deputy governor of the Province of Maine. He died in 1665.

It has been speculated that Edward Smalley was the son of Sir Walter Raleigh but there proved to be no evidence to support this; the theory was disapproved by research from several recognised genealogists. There was speculation that Edward Smalley was a brother to John Small, who migrated to New England in the early 1600s, but DNA testing ruled this out. Several DNA tests for descendants for both Edward and John Small have not shown common genetic markers.

References

People from York County, Maine
1589 births
1665 deaths
People from Bideford
English emigrants